Unstoppable Force is the second album by American heavy metal band Agent Steel. It was recorded at Morrisound Recording Studios in Tampa, Florida from March - June 1986, and was digitally mastered in July 1986 at Criteria Studios in Miami, Florida. The album was released by Combat Records in March 1987. The 1999 reissue by Century Media Records contains the Mad Locust Rising EP, which some later reissues excludes the cover version of the Judas Priest song "The Ripper". It was the last album before the band split up in 1988, only to reform in 1998 for the release of the 1999 album Omega Conspiracy.

Track listing
Credits adapted from the album liner notes.

Personnel
Agent Steel
John Cyriis – vocals
Juan Garcia – guitars
Bernie Versailles – guitars
Michael Zaputil – bass
Chuck Profus – drums

Additional Musicians
Ben Meyer, Nasty Ronnie – backing vocals on "Indestructive" and "Rager"

Production
Dan Johnson – producer
Jim Morris – engineering
Tom Morris – engineering, mixing
Randy Burns – engineering (additional)
Scott Burns – engineering (pre-production)
Mike Fuller – mastering
Steve Sinclair – executive producer
Rick Frehsee – front cover underwater photography
Gerald McLaughlin – logo air brushing
Mark Weinberg – design, typography
John Cyriis – cover concept

References

1987 albums
Agent Steel albums
Combat Records albums
Music for Nations albums
Albums recorded at Morrisound Recording